Ali Nobakht Haghighi (born in 1948 in Rasht) is a renowned Iranian physician. He is the president of Iranian Society of Organ Donation and a permanent member and former secretary of Iranian Academy of Medical Sciences. He is a professor of medicine and nephrology and founding member for reestablishing of Iranian Society of Nephrology in 1992. He worked as deputy minister of medical students affairs and treatment affairs of department of health during the tenure of Dr.Iradj Fazel and Dr.Reza Malekzadeh. He was elected as council member and vice president of Medical Council of Iran (1991–1996). In aftermath of 2009 Iranian presidential election, Nobakht resigned from governmental positions. As a reformist member of parliament, he urged Iranian president to include women in cabinet as ministers and avoid ignoring half of the population.  Nobakht criticized the government for censorship of internet and filtering social media applications including Telegram.   He did not pursue a second term candidacy for Iran parliament citing ineffectiveness of parliament to fulfill Iranian people expectations.

Education
Nobakht graduated from Isfahan Medical University in 1978; residency of internal medicine at Firoozgar General Hospital, 1982; Nephrology Fellowship at Iranian Council for Graduate Medical Education, 1989.

Scholarship
Nobakht is the author of several scientific papers published in peer reviewed journals.

References

Iranian nephrologists
Academic staff of Shahid Beheshti University
Iranian educators
1948 births
Living people
People from Rasht
Moderation and Development Party politicians
Members of the 10th Islamic Consultative Assembly
Deputies of Tehran, Rey, Shemiranat and Eslamshahr